In the 2019–20 season, Partizani Tirana will be competing in the Kategoria Superiore for the seventh consecutive season.

Players

Transfers

Summer

In:

Out:

Competitions

Overview

Albanian Supercup

Kategoria Superiore

League table

Results summary

Results by round

Matches

Albanian Cup

First round

Second round

UEFA Champions League

First qualifying round

UEFA Europa League

Second qualifying round

Statistics

Top scorers

Last updated: 1 August 2019

Clean sheets
The list is sorted by shirt number when total appearances are equal.

Last updated: 10 July 2019

Notes

References

External links
Official website

Partizani
FK Partizani Tirana seasons
Partizani
Partizani